Ellobium pyramidale is a species of small, air-breathing, saltmarsh snail, a terrestrial pulmonate gastropod mollusk in the family Ellobiidae.

References

Ellobiidae
Gastropods described in 1822